The 1986 Togolese coup d'état attempt was a coup attempt that occurred in the West African country of Togo on 23 September 1986. The coup attempt consisted of a group of some 70 armed dissidents crossed into capital Lomé from Ghana in an unsuccessful attempt to overthrow the government of President General Gnassingbé Eyadéma.

The coup attempt
According to radio reports, at about 20:00 UTC, the rebels entered Lomé (located on the border with Ghana) in about 30–40 trucks. They headed straight for a military camp in where Eyadéma resided, and opened fire with automatic weapons and rocket launchers.

The rebels also attacked the radio station and the governing RPT party headquarters.

A radio report said the rebel attack was repulsed by a counterattack led by Eyadema himself. The crushing of the coup attempt involved Togolese Armed Forces troops and warplanes. At least 14 or 13 people were killed in an all-night street battle, and 19 of the rebels were captured. 6 civilians also were killed, state-run radio reported. 

The West German Foreign Ministry officials said in Bonn that their citizen, a businessman, was killed in the fighting. They described the battle as an apparent bid to topple the government.

Aftermath
The Ghana–Togo border was closed. People were ordered off the streets, and an indefinite curfew was imposed on Lomé.

Following the requested of Eyadéma for military help of France, the French Defence Ministry said on 26 September that it was sending warplanes and troops to Togo. The ministry said the troops were being sent in line with a 1963 agreement with Togo.

Eyadéma was re-elected unopposed at the 21 December 1986 presidential election, and continued to rule the country until his death on 5 February 2005.

References

Notes

Bibliography

1986 Coup attempt
Military coups in Togo
Togo coup attempt
Coup attempt
September 1986 events in Africa
1980s coups d'état and coup attempts
Coup d'état attempts in Africa